Kosino is a Moscow Railway station on the Kazansky and Ryazansky suburban railway lines in Moscow, Russia. It was opened in 1894 and will be rebuilt in 2023.

Gallery

References

Railway stations in Moscow
Railway stations of Moscow Railway
Railway stations in the Russian Empire opened in 1894